Qualifying for the 2023 Rugby World Cup for Oceania Rugby began in July 2021, where 3 teams competed for one direct qualification spot into the final tournament and for a place in a cross-regional play-off match.

Format
Oceania Rugby was granted one direct qualification berth, and was awarded to the winner on aggregate of a Samoa–Tonga home and away play-off (Oceania 1). The loser then progressed to a straight play-off match against the winner of the 2021 Oceania Rugby Cup to advance as Oceania 2 to a cross-regional play-off against Asia 1. All matches were held in New Zealand due to COVID-19 restrictions and rates in the region.

Entrants
Seven teams had meant to compete during for the Oceania qualifiers for the 2023 Rugby World Cup, but later reduced to only 3 after the cancelation of the 2021 Oceania Rugby Cup; teams World Rankings are prior to the first Oceania qualification match on 10 July while nations in bold denote teams that have previously played in a Rugby World Cup.

Round 1: 2021 Oceania Rugby Cup
Papua New Guinea were due to host the 2021 Oceania Rugby Cup which was due to take place in June 2021. However, in April 2021, the participating unions agreed to cancel the tournament due to the rising impacts of the COVID-19 pandemic in the region. With the event's cancellation and the tight timeframe available to determine the region's champion, the World Rugby Rankings were used to confirm the team progressing in the Rugby World Rugby 2023 qualification process, and with the Cook Islands the highest-ranked team at the time, earned progression to Round 3.

Round 2: Oceania 1 play-offs
Round 2 consisted of a 2-leg play-off series between the highest-ranked participating teams in Oceania; Samoa and Tonga. This series was scheduled to be a home-and-away play-off series in Samoa and Tonga, but due to restrictions in the region, New Zealand became the hub for the qualification round.

The winner of this round, Samoa, qualified as Oceania 1, whilst the loser moved to round 3 to play the Cook Islands in an Oceania 2 play-off decider.

|-

|}

Leg 1

Notes:
 James Faiva was named to start but withdrew ahead of the game and was replaced by Nafi Tuitavake, who was replaced by Viliami Fine.
 Tomasi Alosio, Jonah Aoina, Neria Fomai, Theo McFarland, Olajuwon Noa, Samuel Slade, Jonathan Taumateine, Kalolo Tuiloma and Tietie Tuimauga (all Samoa) and Viliami Fine and Sam Vaka (both Tonga) made their international debuts.

Leg 2

Notes:
 Jay Fonokalafi and Aisea Halo (both Tonga) and Losi Filipo and JP Sauni (both Samoa) made their international debuts.

Round 3: Oceania 2 play-off
The winner of this match, Tonga, advanced to a Asia/Oceania play-off match against Asia 1 (as Oceania 2), with the winner earning the right to qualify for the 2023 Rugby World Cup as the Asia/Pacific play-off winner.

Notes:
 Tovo Faleafa, Kelemete Finau, Paula Mahe, Nela Matakaiongo, Semisi Paea and John Tapueluelu (all Tonga) and Jardine Pumati Chung-Ching, Leon Ellia-Niukore, Tahquinn Hansen, Leroy Henry-Jack, Gideon Kautai, Antonio Ripata, Te Puhi Rudolph, Ezekiel Sopoaga, Tokahirere Sopoaga, Tupou Sopoaga, Junior Taia, Materua Tupou, Ben Tou and  Tevita Yamaraki (all Cook Islands) made their international debuts.

References

Notes

External links
 Rugby World Cup Official Site

2023
2023 Rugby World Cup qualification
World Cup
World Cup